Previtali is a surname. Notable people with the surname include:

Roberto Previtali, Italian footballer
Robin Previtali, French footballer
Fernando Previtali (1907–1985), Italian conductor
Andrea Previtali (1480–1528), Italian painter
Sergio Previtali (1939–2007), Uruguayan politician